Howard Hall (born Charles Sumner; 30 May 1867 – 25 July 1921) was an American actor and writer, best known for Alias Mrs. Jessop.

Hall was born in 1867 in Michigan. He died on 1921 in Long Beach, California.

Filmography
 The Crown Prince's Double (1915)
 The Clarion (1916)
 According to Law (1916)
 The Hungry Heart (1917)
 The Barrier (1917)
 The Weavers of Life (1917)
 Alias Mrs. Jessop (1917)
 Flower of the Dusk (1918)
 Treason (1918)
 The Echo of Youth (1919)
 The Human Orchid (1916)
 The Price of Innocence (1919)
 The Gold Cure (1919)
 Sunshine Harbor (1922)

References

External links

1867 births
1921 deaths
Male actors from Michigan
American male actors